The 1936 Michigan State Spartans football team represented Michigan State College as an independent during the 1936 college football season. In their fourth season under head coach Charlie Bachman, the Spartans compiled a 6–1–2 record, outscored their opponents by a total of 143 to 40, and won their annual rivalry game with Michigan by a 21 to 7 score. In inter-sectional play, the team defeated Carnegie Tech (7–0), Kansas (41–0), and Arizona (7–0) and tied Boston College (13–13). The team's only loss was to Marquette by a 13 to 7 score.

Key players included halfbacks John Pingel, Al Agett, and Steve Sebo, fullbacks Art Brandstatter Sr. and George Kovacich, quarterback Charley Halbert, end Milton Lenhardt, and guard Norman Olman.

Schedule

References

Michigan State
Michigan State Spartans football seasons
Michigan State Spartans football